San Marcellino is a comune (municipality) in the Province of Caserta in the Italian region Campania, located about  northwest of Naples and about  southwest of Caserta.

San Marcellino borders the following municipalities: Aversa, Casapesenna, Frignano, Trentola-Ducenta, Villa di Briano.

References

Cities and towns in Campania